Deportivo is a rapid transit station in San Juan agglomeration, Puerto Rico. It is located between Bayamón and Jardines on the sole line of the Tren Urbano system, in Bayamón, just outside of its downtown (Bayamón Pueblo). The trial service ran in 2004, however, the regular service only started on 6 June 2005.

The station is named after the Bayamón Sports Complex (Spanish: Complejo Deportivo de Bayamón) which is located nearby.

Nearby 
 Complejo Deportivo de Bayamón
 Juan Ramón Loubriel Stadium
 Ruben Rodríguez Coliseum
 Miguel J. Frau Gymnasium
 Bayamón City Hall
 Bayamón Judicial Center
 Bayamón River Lineal Park
 Santa Rosa Mall

References

Tren Urbano stations
Railway stations in the United States opened in 2004
2004 establishments in Puerto Rico